Samurai Shodown, known in Japan as  is a fighting game developed and published by SNK for the Neo Geo arcade and home platform. Released in 1993, it is the first installment in the Samurai Shodown series. In contrast to other fighting games at the time, which were set in modern times and focused primarily on hand-to-hand combat, Samurai Shodown is set in feudal-era Japan (similar to Kaneko's Shogun Warriors which was released the year prior) and was SNK's first arcade fighting game to focus primarily on weapon-based combat.

Samurai Shodown was a commercial success, becoming Japan's sixth highest-grossing arcade game of 1993 and one of America's top five highest-grossing arcade conversion kits of 1994. It won several Game of the Year awards from Gamest, Electronic Gaming Monthly and the European Computer Trade Show.

Gameplay

The game is set in the late 18th century, and all the characters wield weapons. The game uses music from the time period, with sounds of traditional Japanese instruments, such as the shakuhachi and shamisen. A refined version of the camera zoom first found in Art of Fighting is used in Samurai Shodown. The game includes the portrayal of blood.

The game became renowned for its fast pace. Focusing more on quick, powerful strikes than combos, the slow motion was added to intensify the damage dealt from hard hits. During a match, a referee holds flags representing each player (Player 1 is white; Player 2 is red). When a player lands a successful hit, the referee lifts the corresponding flag, indicating who dealt the blow.

A delivery man occasionally appears in the background and throws items such as bombs or health-restoring chicken, which can change the outcome.

Plot

Shiro Tokisada Amakusa, slain in Japan of 1638 by the forces of the Tokugawa Shogunate for his part in the Shimabara Rebellion, was resurrected in 1787 as an akuma from making a deal with the dark god Ambrosia by bringing the evil entity into the world by using the Palenke stone and its energy. Driven by hatred for the Shogunate and having a nihilistic streak towards the world, he unleashes his dark powers to bring chaos to all of existence in 1788. A variety of warriors—some historic, some fictional—converge upon the source of the chaos, each driven by their own reasons.

Development
Samurai Shodown evolved from what was originally planned to be a traditional side-scrolling beat 'em up, featuring monsters as the dark heroes (similar to Data East's Night Slashers). However, after considering what would sell to a global audience, series-creator and director Yasushi Adachi decided that a fighting game with distinctly Japanese characters, such as samurai and ninjas, would do better. The only hold-over from the original concept was Genan Shiranui, the hunchbacked claw-handed creature who was inspired by Adachi's fascination with Tim Burton's Edward Scissorhands.

The programming team for Samurai Shodown consisted of a combination of veteran SNK programmers and former Capcom employees.

The idea to spell the English title "Shodown" rather than "Showdown" came from SNK's U.S. distributor: They felt the Japanese title "Samurai Spirits" did not adequately explain the game, and felt the spelling could be a play on the word shogun, based on the lingering popularity of the Shogun miniseries.

Release
The Neo Geo AES version of the game was released for the Wii Virtual Console on October 16, 2007, in Japan; May 30, 2008, in Europe; and June 16, 2008, in North America. However, before the Virtual Console version was released in North America, the game was released as part of SNK Arcade Classics Vol. 1.

Mostly due to the negative publicity surrounding the use of violence in video games, the game was edited when it was first released for the AES as it featured blood and graphic fatal attacks that kill opponents by slicing them in half. As a result, it was decided to censor the game for most platforms by changing the blood from red to white and disabling the fatal attack animations. The win quotes were also censored, and references to death or blood were altered.

In the Super NES version, the blood was recolored orange and the fatal attacks were removed.

The 3DO version was first released in 1994 in North America, then in Japan and Europe the following year, with all blood and fatality graphics intact. As a result, some retailers didn't carry this edition of the game.

The censoring of the Neo Geo console version was unusual in that it was tied to the specific system. For instance, a North American cartridge running on a North American Neo Geo would display white sweat, but the same cartridge, when plugged into a Japanese Neo Geo, would run the uncensored game with blood. Neo Geo console modifications would enable users to set the system's region to Japan, or play in arcade mode, either of which would cause the game to be played with all of the blood and death animations intact, even on a North American/PAL console.

Version differences
In addition to the Neo Geo system, the AES, Samurai Shodown was ported to multiple other platforms, including the Super NES, Game Boy, Mega Drive/Genesis, Game Gear, Sega CD, Sega Saturn, 3DO, FM Towns, PlayStation and PlayStation 2. All of the cartridge versions were handled by Takara, while Crystal Dynamics ported the 3DO version, and Funcom handled the Sega CD port.

The Mega Drive/Genesis and Sega CD versions omit the character Earthquake and his stage. Both versions lack the camera zoom, and the camera is locked in a close zoom. This gives better detail to the characters, but the fighting area is smaller. In addition, some attacks were altered or removed entirely from the Mega Drive/Genesis version of the game. The final boss is playable in the two-player mode without the use of a code. The Mega Drive/Genesis version lacks the arcade introduction, instead of displaying the arcade version's text with no background graphics or speech. Also, the character artwork shown after beating an opponent is missing, and portions of some characters' endings are missing. The announcer no longer says the names of the characters before a fight or after winning a fight. The Sega CD version retains the arcade introduction and is only missing portions of some characters' endings. The Sega CD version also includes the attacks that were removed or altered in the Mega Drive/Genesis version, and the music is the same as the arcade version.

The SNES version has the character line-up intact but has the game zoomed out, which makes the character sprites smaller compared to the other ports. This version has all of the stages from the arcade version, and they are less restricted compared to the Mega Drive/Genesis and Sega CD ports. This version also supports Dolby Surround sound. The SNES version includes the arcade intro sequence, although the voice accompanying the text is missing, the character artwork shown after beating an opponent is present, as are the arcade endings. The announcer, like the Sega CD version, says the names of the characters before a fight and after winning a fight. The SNES version has no blood, being replaced by sweat. An exclusive mode, count down, is included in this port. Players can also use the final boss in two-player mode with a secret code.

The Game Boy version includes all the characters, stages, and most of the special moves, but has no combos, fatalities, or voices. All the music tracks are included, albeit in scaled-down form.

The Game Gear port offered only 9 fighting characters to choose from (Gen-An, Galford, Haohmaru, Ukyo, Charlotte, Nakoruru, Jubei, Hanzo, and Kyoshiro), whilst the original (SNK arcades) version offered 12.

Unlike most early home versions of the game, the 3DO version includes the camera zoom, as well as all the characters, special moves, and fatalities.

Reception

Neo Geo
In Japan, Game Machine listed Samurai Spirits on their August 15, 1993, issue as being the most-popular table arcade game at the time. It went on to be Japan's sixth highest-grossing arcade game of 1993. In North America, RePlay reported Samurai Shodown to be the most-popular arcade software kit for four months in 1993, from August to October and then again in December. Play Meter listed it as America's third most-popular arcade game in October 1993. It went on to be one of America's top five highest-grossing arcade conversion kits of 1994.

In the February 1994 issue of Gamest magazine in Japan, Samurai Shodown was awarded Best Game of 1993 in the Seventh Annual Gamest Grand Prize, as well as being the first to win in the category of Best Fighting Game (Street Fighter II Dash, the previous Game of the Year, won as Best Action Game). Samurai Shodown also placed first in Best VGM, Best Album and Best Direction, and second place in Best Graphics. In the Best Characters list, Nakoruru placed No. 1, Haohmaru at No. 6, Jubei Yagyu at No. 8, a tie between Ukyo Tachibana, Galford, and Poppy at No. 11, Charlotte at No. 16 (tied with Duck King from Fatal Fury Special), Kuroko at No. 18, Tam Tam and Hanzo Hattori tied for No. 22, Gen-an Shiranui at No. 29, and Wan-Fu tied at No. 45 with five other characters.

Samurai Shodown won multiple awards from Electronic Gaming Monthly in their 1993 video game awards, including Best Neo-Geo Game, Best Fighting Game, and Game of the Year. It was awarded "Game of the Year" at the April 1994 European Computer Trade Show (ECTS).

In 1997, Electronic Gaming Monthly listed the Neo Geo AES version as number 99 on their "100 Best Games of All Time", citing the solid fighting engine, realistic use of blood, and easy to execute moves.

Ports
Famicom Tsūshin gave the Super Famicom version an 8 out of 10 in their Reader Cross Review. Electronic Gaming Monthly gave the Super NES version a 37 out of 50, commenting that despite the lack of scaling, it is still a very good port.

GamePro considered the Genesis version to be superior to the Super NES version, citing the Genesis version's better scale (zoomed-in versus the zoomed-out graphics of the Super NES version) and the awkward control configuration on the Super NES version. They held the Game Boy version to be surprisingly good given the hardware, but ultimately unsatisfying, and concluded that hardcore fans should pass on even the Genesis version in favor of the upcoming 3DO and Sega CD versions. Next Generation reviewed the Genesis version of the game, rating it three stars out of five, and stated that "fans of the arcade game won't be disappointed with this solid translation, complete with blood and all the varied endings of the original."

Famicom Tsūshin scored the 3DO version of the game a 25 out of 40. Electronic Gaming Monthly scored the 3DO version 38 out of 50, calling it "A very faithful home version of the arcade fighter". A reviewer for Next Generation remarked that "The 3DO conversion is nearly identical to the arcade version, much more faithful than the previous SNES, Genesis, and Sega CD versions. The load time between rounds is noticeable, but acceptable." He gave it three out of five stars. GamePro praised the general gameplay but criticized the quality of the conversion, complaining that the scaling is not as smooth as the arcade version, the animations are slower, the load times are interminably long, and the gameplay is crippled by a poor control configuration, which the player is not given the option to change.

GamePro named the Sega CD port the best Sega CD game at the 1994 Consumer Electronics Show. Their eventual review, however, was largely mixed. They criticized the slowdown, lack of scaling, frequent load times, and low-quality reproduction of the arcade version's sounds, and added that the fact that Samurai Shodown was by then a three-year-old game makes the Sega CD version's faults stand out more. Electronic Gaming Monthly scored it 30 out of 40 and declared it "the best conversion of the game that made the Neo Geo the system of choice for fighting games." They particularly praised the accurate graphics, short load times, and ease of pulling off special moves. In 2018, Complex rated Samurai Shodown 40th on their "The Best Super Nintendo Games of All Time." They praised the graphics, game controls and saying everything is on point in the game. In 1995, Flux magazine listed Samurai Shodown 80th in their "Top 100 Video Games." In 1996, Super Play named the game 99th on its Top 100 SNES Games of All Time.

Legacy
Three anime adaptations based on the game have been made. Samurai Spirits: Haten Gouma no Shou in 1994, which is a full-length film; Samurai Spirits 2: Asura Zanmaden in 1999, with two episodes and Nakoruru ~Ano hito kara no okurimono~ in 2002, a one-episode OVA.

Notes

References

External links 
 
 Samurai Shodown at GameFAQs
 Samurai Shodown at Giant Bomb
 Samurai Shodown at Killer List of Videogames
 Samurai Shodown at MobyGames

1993 video games
3DO Interactive Multiplayer games
ACA Neo Geo games
Arcade video games
Crystal Dynamics games
D4 Enterprise games
Fighting games
2D fighting games
FM Towns games
Funcom games
Game Boy games
Multiplayer and single-player video games
Neo Geo games
Neo Geo CD games
Nintendo Switch games
PlayStation (console) games
PlayStation Network games
PlayStation 4 games
Samurai Shodown video games
Sega CD games
Game Gear games
Sega Genesis games
SNK games
SNK Playmore games
Super Nintendo Entertainment System games
Takara video games
Video games about samurai
Video games scored by Masahiko Hataya
Video games set in the 18th century
Video games set in Japan
Video games set in France
Video games set in China
Video games set in South America
Video games set in the United States
Video games set in Texas
Video games set in San Francisco
Virtual Console games
BMG Interactive games
Video games developed in Japan
Xbox One games
Hamster Corporation games